The term Turco-Persian Wars can refer to two sets of conflicts between Turkic states and Persian states:

The Göktürk–Persian wars, between the Göktürks and the Sasanian Empire:
First Perso-Turkic War (588)
Second Perso-Turkic War (619)
Third Perso-Turkic War (627–629)

The Ottoman–Persian Wars, between the Ottoman Empire and a succession of Persian dynasties:
 Battle of Chaldiran (1514)
 Ottoman–Safavid War (1532–1555)
 Ottoman–Safavid War (1578–1590)
 Ottoman–Safavid War (1603–1618)
 Ottoman–Safavid War (1623–1639)
 Ottoman–Persian War (1730–1735)
 Ottoman–Persian War (1743–1746)
 Ottoman–Persian War (1775–1776)
 Ottoman–Persian War (1821–1823)